Las Vegas Grammar School refer to:
Las Vegas Grammar School (Las Vegas Boulevard, Las Vegas, Nevada)
Las Vegas Grammar School (Washington and D Streets, Las Vegas, Nevada)